Roman Kerschbaum (born 19 January 1994) is an Austrian professional footballer who plays for Rapid Wien, as a midfielder.

Career
Born in Neunkirchen, Kerschbaum has previously played for Nürnberg and Grödig.

Career statistics

References

External links
Roman Kerschbaum at ÖFB

1994 births
Living people
Austrian footballers
1. FC Nürnberg II players
SV Grödig players
FC Wacker Innsbruck (2002) players
FC Admira Wacker Mödling players
SK Rapid Wien players
Austrian Football Bundesliga players
2. Liga (Austria) players
Regionalliga players
Association football midfielders
Austrian expatriate footballers
Austrian expatriate sportspeople in Germany
Expatriate footballers in Germany
Footballers from Lower Austria